Yu Endo (born 29 October 1997) is a Japanese professional footballer who plays as a midfielder for WE League club Urawa Reds.

Club career 
Endo made her WE League debut on 12 September 2021.

References 

Japanese women's footballers
Living people
1997 births
Women's association football midfielders
Sportspeople from Saitama (city)
Association football people from Saitama Prefecture
Urawa Red Diamonds Ladies players
WE League players